FK Radnički Pirot is a football club based in Pirot, Serbia. They compete in the Serbian League East, the third tier of the national league system.

History
The club was founded immediately after World War II in 1945. They made their Yugoslav Second League debut in the 1969–70 campaign. Over the next 12 seasons, the club competed in the second tier of Yugoslav football, before being relegated in 1981. They were promoted back the following year and played another six seasons in the Second League (1982–1988), before the competition was reorganized. In the 1975–76 Yugoslav Cup, the club made one of the greatest accomplishments in its history by eliminating Red Star Belgrade to reach the quarter-finals, eventually losing to Dinamo Zagreb.

Following the dissolution of SFR Yugoslavia, the club competed in the newly formed Second League of FR Yugoslavia in the 1992–93 season, but failed to avoid relegation. They returned to the second tier three years later and subsequently placed third in Group East in their comeback appearance. However, the club suffered relegation to the third tier in 1998.

In the new millennium, the club surprisingly reached the quarter-finals of the 2004–05 Serbia and Montenegro Cup, being eliminated by Rad after losing 1–0 at home. They also earned promotion to the Serbian First League in the same season by winning the Serbian League East. The club spent the next three seasons in the second tier of Serbian football, before being relegated back to the Serbian League East in 2008. In the meantime, they achieved another success in the national cup by reaching the 2006–07 Serbian Cup quarter-finals, but lost 2–1 to Vojvodina at home.

After spending eight consecutive seasons in the Serbian League East, the club was promoted as champions to the Serbian First League in 2016. They were relegated back to the third tier in 2018, only to return to the second tier in 2019.

Honours
Serbian League Timok / Serbian League Niš / Serbian League East (Tier 3)
 1995–96 / 2000–01 / 2004–05, 2015–16, 2018–19

Seasons

Supporters
The club's main supporters' group is known as Pirgosi. They were founded in the summer of 1990. The group is traditionally situated in the east stand of the stadium.

Notable players
This is a list of players who have played at full international level.
  Nikola Đurđić
  Andrija Kaluđerović
  Ivan Gvozdenović
  Nenad Jestrović
  Mateja Kežman
  Radivoje Manić
  Zoran Ranković
  Jovan Stanković
  Jovan Anđelković
For a list of all FK Radnički Pirot players with a Wikipedia article, see :Category:FK Radnički Pirot players.

Managerial history

References

External links
 Club page at Srbijasport

 
1945 establishments in Serbia
Association football clubs established in 1945
Football clubs in Serbia
Football clubs in Yugoslavia
Pirot